A bag is a non-rigid container.

Bag may also refer to:

Places
 Bag (Bužim), a settlement in Bužim, in Bosnia and Herzegovina
 Bag, Hungary, a village in Hungary
 Bag, Kohgiluyeh and Boyer-Ahmad, a village in Kohgiluyeh and Boyer-Ahmad Province, Iran
 Bag, Qasr-e Qand, a village in Sistan and Baluchestan Province, Iran
 Bag, Gilan, a village in Gilan Province, Iran
 Bag, Zanjan, a village in Zanjan Province, Iran
 Bags of Mongolia, a third level administrative subdivision of Mongolia
 Bag End, a fictional location in Lord of the Rings

Other uses
 Bag (album), an album by God Street Wine
 Bag (fishing & hunting), a quantity of fish caught or game killed
 Bag (mathematics) or multiset, a generalization of a set
 Bag (puzzle), a logic puzzle
 Bag (unit), various units of measurement 
 Baggage or luggage, bags, cases and containers which hold a traveler's articles during transit
 Bathymetric Attributed Grid, a data format for bathymetric data
 Handbag, a bag that is used typically by women to hold personal items
 Punching bag, a sturdy bag designed to be repeatedly punched
 Black Artists Group
 "Bags", a commonly used nickname for vibraphonist Milt Jackson
 BAG Electronics, a subsidiary of Trilux
 Bundesamt für Gesundheit, German-language name for the Swiss Federal Office of Public Health
 "Bag", colloquial term for a base on a baseball field
 Vulgar slang for the human scrotum
 Bagman, a political operative

See also
 Satchel (bag)
 Bagh (disambiguation)
 Bagg (disambiguation)
 Bagger, an unofficial title given to a courtesy clerk at a supermarket
 Sack (disambiguation)